Minganie is a regional county municipality in the Côte-Nord region of Quebec, Canada.  It includes Anticosti Island.  Its seat is Havre-Saint-Pierre.

It has an area of  according to Quebec's Ministère des Affaires municipales, des Régions et de l'Occupation du territoire (which includes coastal, lake, and river water territory and also disputed land within Labrador), or a land area of  according to Statistics Canada.  The population from the Canada 2011 Census was 6,582 and in 2016 it was 11,323. The majority live in Havre-Saint-Pierre.

Minganie and the neighbouring Le Golfe-du-Saint-Laurent Regional County Municipality are grouped into the single census division of Minganie—Le Golfe-du-Saint-Laurent (known as Minganie–Basse-Côte-Nord before 2010).  The combined population at the Canada 2011 Census was 11,708.

Until 2002, Minganie RCM encompassed the entire lower north shore right up to Blanc-Sablon. In 2002, it lost all the coastal communities east of the Natashquan River when the Basse-Côte-Nord Territory was formed. In July 2010, the RCM lost another 44% of its territory when the (uninhabited) Petit-Mécatina unorganized territory was transferred to the newly created Le Golfe-du-Saint-Laurent Regional County Municipality, which superseded Basse-Côte-Nord.

Subdivisions
There are 9 subdivisions and 2 native reserves within the RCM:

Municipalities (8)
 Aguanish
 Baie-Johan-Beetz
 Havre-Saint-Pierre
 L'Île-d'Anticosti
 Longue-Pointe-de-Mingan
 Natashquan
 Rivière-au-Tonnerre
 Rivière-Saint-Jean

Unorganized Territory (1)
 Lac-Jérôme

Native Reserves (2)
 Mingan
 Nutashkuan

Transportation

Access Routes
Highways and numbered routes that run through the municipality, including external routes that start or finish at the county border:

 Autoroutes
 None

 Principal Highways
 

 Secondary Highways
 None

 External Routes
 None

River basins

There are a number of large rivers that flow in a generally north–south direction through Minganie to enter the Gulf. Near the coast the river basins tend to narrow in towards the river mouth, and between their mouths are areas that drain into the Gulf through smaller streams. From west to east, the larger river basins, which may cover parts of Labrador, Sept-Rivières or Le Golfe-du-Saint-Laurent, are:

See also
 List of regional county municipalities and equivalent territories in Quebec

References

External links 
 Municipalité régionale de comté de Minganie

 
States and territories established in 1982